Hayrullah Erkip (born 20 June 2003) is a Turkish professional footballer who plays as a winger for TFF First League club Gençlerbirliği on loan from Kayserispor.

Professional career
A youth product of Kayserispor, Erkip had a brief stint with the academy of Beşiktaş in 2021 before returning to Kayserispor that same year. On 17 January 2022, he signed his first professional contract with Kayserispor for 4.5 years. He made his professional debut with Kayserispor in a 1–1 Süper Lig tie with Gaziantep FK on 6 May 2022. He scored his first goal in his second professional league appearance with Kayserispor, a 3–0 win over Yeni Malatyaspor on 14 May 2022. On 12 January 2023, Erkip joined Gençlerbirliği on loan.

References

External links
 

2003 births
Living people
People from Kayseri
Turkish footballers
Kayserispor footballers
Gençlerbirliği S.K. footballers
Süper Lig players
TFF First League players
Association football wingers